The 2019 European Junior & U23 Weightlifting Championships took place in Rin Grand Hotel, Bucharest, Romania from 18 to 27 October 2019.

Team ranking

Medal summary

Juniors

Men

Women
{| 
|-
!colspan=7|45 kg
|-
|Snatch
| || 69 kg
| || 68 kg
| || 66 kg
|-
|Clean & Jerk
| || 84 kg
| || 83 kg
| || 83 kg
|-bgcolor=ffffcc
|Total
| || 152 kg
| || 149 kg
| || 147 kg
|-
!colspan=7|49 kg
|-
|Snatch
| || 83 kgWYR, EJR
| || 77 kg
| || 76 kg
|-
|Clean & Jerk
| || 93 kgEYR
| || 93 kg
| || 92 kg
|-bgcolor=ffffcc
|Total
| || 176 kgEYR
| || 170 kg
| || 167 kg
|-
!colspan=7|55 kg
|-
|Snatch
| || 91 kg
| || 87 kg
| || 85 kg
|-
|Clean & Jerk
| || 107 kg
| || 107 kg
| || 105 kg
|-bgcolor=ffffcc
|Total
| || 198 kgEJR
| || 192 kg
| || 191 kg
|-
!colspan=7|59 kg
|-
|Snatch
| || 88 kg
| || 87 kg
| || 86 kg
|-
|Clean & Jerk
| || 116 kg
| || 104 kg
| || 104 kg
|-bgcolor=ffffcc
|Total
| || 203 kg
| || 190 kg
| || 188 kg
|-
!colspan=7|64 kg
|-
|Snatch
| || 95 kgEYR
| || 95 kg
| || 94 kg
|-
|Clean & Jerk
| || 118 kg
| || 116 kg
| || 115 kg
|-bgcolor=ffffcc
|Total
| || 212 kg
| || 210 kg
| || 205 kg
|-
!colspan=7|71 kg
|-
|Snatch
| || 93 kg
| || 92 kg
| || 91 kg
|-
|Clean & Jerk
| || 115 kg
| || 113 kg
| || 113 kg
|-bgcolor=ffffcc
|Total
| || 206 kg
| || 203 kg
| || 201 kg
|-
!colspan=7|76 kg
|-
|Snatch
| || 94 kg
| || 94 kg
| || 93 kg
|-
|Clean & Jerk
| || 130 kgWYR
| || 113 kg
| || 112 kg
|-bgcolor=ffffcc
|Total
| || 224 kg
| || 206 kg
| || 203 kg
|-
!colspan=7|81 kg
|-
|Snatch
| || 95 kg
| || 90 kg
| || 89 kg
|-
|Clean & Jerk
| || 120 kg
| || 112 kg
| || 112 kg
|-bgcolor=ffffcc
|Total
| || 215 kg
| || 201 kg
| || 197 kg
|-
!colspan=7|87 kg
|-
|Snatch
| || 98 kg
| || 97 kg
| || 94 kg
|-
|Clean & Jerk
| || 132 kg
| || 128 kg
| || 117 kg
|-bgcolor=ffffcc
|Total
| || 230 kg
| || 225 kg
| || 211 kg
|-
!colspan=7|+87 kg
|-
|Snatch
| || 100 kg
| || 96 kg
| || 94 kg
|-
|Clean & Jerk
| || 134 kg
| || 133 kg
| || 117 kg
|-bgcolor=ffffcc
|Total
| || 234 kg
| || 231 kg
| || 218 kg
|}

Under-23
Men

Women

Medal table
Ranking by Big (Total result) medals

Ranking by all medals: Big (Total result) and Small''' (Snatch and Clean & Jerk)

Participating nations

References

External links
Results
Results book (Archived version)

European Junior & U23 Weightlifting Championships
International sports competitions hosted by Romania
2019 in weightlifting
2019 in Romanian sport
Weightlifting in Romania
Sports competitions in Bucharest
European Junior and U23 Weightlifting Championships